The Miami-Dade County Public Schools district has 58 middle schools. This page shows first a list of names and then a more descriptive list of some middle schools.

Simple list of middle schools in the district
These middle schools serve grades 6–8 with exceptions as noted (names in boldface are the subject of sections of this article):

Allapattah Middle School
Andover Middle School
Arvida Middle School
Brownsville Middle School
Campbell Drive Middle School
Carol City Middle School
Charles H. Drew Middle School
Citrus Grove Middle School
Country Club Middle School
Cutler Ridge Middle School
Doral Middle School
George Washington Carver Middle School
Glades Middle School
Hammocks Middle School
Henry H. Filer Middle School
Herbert A. Ammons Middle School
Hialeah Gardens Middle School
Hialeah Middle School
Highland Oaks Middle School
Homestead Middle School
Horace Mann Middle School - grades 6–8; technology magnet
Howard D. McMillan Middle School
iMater Academy Middle School
John F. Kennedy Middle School
Jorge Mas Canosa Middle School
Jose De Diego Middle School
Kinloch Park Middle School
Lake Stevens Middle School
Lamar Louise Curry Middle School

Lawton Chiles Middle School
Madison Middle School
Mays Middle School
Miami Edison Middle School
Miami Lakes Middle School
Miami Springs Middle School
Nautilus Middle School
Norland Middle School
North Dade Middle School
North Miami Middle School
Palm Springs Middle School
Palmetto Middle School
Parkway Middle School
Paul W. Bell Middle School
Ponce De Leon Middle School
Redland Middle School
Richmond Heights Middle School
Riviera Middle School
Rockway Middle School
Ruben Dario Middle School
Shenandoah Middle School
South Dade Middle School - grades 4-8
South Miami Middle Community School
Southwood Middle School
Thomas Jefferson Middle School
W.R. Thomas Middle School
West Miami Middle School
Westview Middle School
Zelda Glazer Middle School

Middle schools without their own articles

Highland Oaks Middle School
This is one of two hurricane animal shelters in the county.

Ponce De Leon Middle School
Ponce De Leon Middle School is a magnet school in Coral Gables. It was founded in 1924 by Robertson Olsen. It was originally  a high school and later became a middle school.

Ruben Dario Middle School
Ruben Dario Middle School (RDMS) is a public school in Miami. It has around 1000 students. The school mascot is the cougar.

Shenandoah Middle School 
Shenandoah Middle School is a public-magnet middle school in the historic Shenandoah section of Miami. It offers a Museum Magnet program for grades 6–8. The curriculum of a Museum Magnet is based on close collaboration with museums for educational expertise and resources.

Shenandoah partners with these museums:

 Dade Heritage Trust Program
 Historical Museum of Southern Florida

 Lowe Art Museum-Univ. of Miami
 Miami Art Museum

 The Wolfsonian-FIU

W.R. Thomas Middle School
W.R. Thomas Middle School is a certified Cambridge Magnet middle school located in Miami.

Rockway Middle School
Rockway Middle School is a Magnet school in Westchester, Florida. Its magnet programs are Robotics, and Law. Its school mascot is a falcon. There are approximately 1,200 students. The school principal is Ms. Josephine Otero.

Notes

Miami-Dade County
Miami-Dade County
Miami-related lists